Hakimi, derived from the Arabic male given name and surname Hakim, is an Arabic (primarily Maghrebi) and Persian surname. Notable people with the surname include:

 Abdul Latif Hakimi, former Taliban spokesman
 Achraf Hakimi (born 1998), Moroccan footballer
 Ali Hakimi (born 1976), Tunisian Swiss middle distance runner
 Arezoo Hakimi (born 1995), Iranian kayaker
 Danial Hakimi (born 1963), Iranian film, stage, TV series and radio actor
 Ebrahim Hakimi (1871–1959), Iranian Azerbaijani politician
 Eklil Ahmad Hakimi (born 1968), Afghan diplomat
 Fardin Hakimi (born 1995), Afghan footballer
 Karim Hakimi (born 1933), Iranian Canadian entrepreneur and optician
 Muhammad Hakimi Ismail (born 1991), Malaysian triple jumper
 S. L. Hakimi (1932–2005), Iranian-American mathematician
Tehila Hakimi (born 1982), Israeli poet and author
Hakimi Abdullah (born 1999), Malaysian professional footballer

References 

Persian-language surnames
Arabic-language surnames
Iranian-language surnames
Patronymic surnames
Surnames from given names